Bernard Patrick Ashley-Seal (born 21 November 1998) is an English professional footballer who plays as a striker for Scottish Championship club Hamilton Academical.

Career

Early career
Ashley-Seal was on the books at Arsenal and Tottenham Hotspur before joining Norwich's academy in 2015. In October 2015, he was named by The Guardian as one of the top twenty prospects of his age group to look out for. Despite this, he did not sign a professional contract with the club and, despite reported interest from Leicester City, instead had trials with Chelsea and Stoke.

In October 2017 he signed with Wolverhampton Wanderers on a two-an-a-half-year deal. He made his professional debut for the club on 28 August 2018 in a 2–0 League Cup victory at Sheffield Wednesday, coming on as a substitute in the 80th minute for Léo Bonatini. He made a further appearance as a substitute in the following round of the competition against Leicester, in which he was the only Wolves player to successfully convert his penalty in a shootout.

On 23 January 2019, having signed a new three-and-a-half-year contract with Wolves, the striker joined LigaPro side Famalicão on loan until the end of the 2018–19 season.

Ashley-Seal made his first start for Wolves on 4 January 2020 in a third round FA Cup tie against Manchester United at Molineux, although he was withdrawn at half-time in favour of Raúl Jiménez., this was to be final appearance for the club. At the end of the month, he moved in a six-month loan deal to League One club Accrington Stanley.

Northampton Town
On 7 September 2020, Ashley-Seal joined League One side Northampton Town on a two-year deal for an undisclosed fee. He scored his first goals for Northampton when he scored twice in an EFL Trophy tie against Southampton U21s on 6 October 2020.

KTP
On 26 July 2022, Ashley-Seal signed for Finnish club KTP.

Hamilton Academical
On March 18 2023, Ashley-Seal joined Hamilton Academical on a contract till end of the season.

Career statistics

References

External links

1998 births
Living people
English footballers
Footballers from Southwark
Association football forwards
Norwich City F.C. players
Wolverhampton Wanderers F.C. players
English Football League players
English expatriate footballers
Black British sportspeople
Accrington Stanley F.C. players
Northampton Town F.C. players
English expatriate sportspeople in Portugal
F.C. Famalicão players
English expatriate sportspeople in Finland
Expatriate footballers in Finland
Expatriate footballers in Portugal